The 2017 Duke Blue Devils men's soccer team represents Duke University during the 2017 NCAA Division I men's soccer season.  The Blue Devils are led by head coach John Kerr, in his tenth season.  They play home games at Koskinen Stadium.  The team was founded in 1935 and currently plays in the Atlantic Coast Conference.

Roster

Updated August 28, 2017

Duke named the five captains listed above prior to the season.

Coaching Staff

Source:

Schedule 
Source:

|-
!colspan=8 style=""| Exhibition

|-
!colspan=7 style=""| Regular season

|-
!colspan=8 style=""| ACC Tournament

|-
!colspan=8 style=""| NCAA Tournament

Awards and honors

Rankings

MLS Draft 
The following members of the 2017 Duke Blue Devils men's soccer team were selected in the 2018 MLS SuperDraft.

References

Duke
Duke Blue Devils men's soccer seasons
Duke men's soccer
Duke
Duke